Line 8 of the Madrid Metro opened between Mar de Cristal and Campo de las Naciones (now Feria de Madrid) on 24 June 1998. An extension to Barajas via Madrid Airport was opened in 1999 and in 2002 an extension to Nuevos Ministerios and Colombia opened. Originally this line was a small-profile line, but in 2002 it became a large rolling stock line. The line uses 4-car versions of class 8000 trains. In 2007 an intermediate station called Pinar del Rey opened between Colombia and Mar de Cristal, as did an extension to the new Terminal 4 of Madrid Airport.

The line was temporarily closed for renovation from 26 January to 12 April 2017.

The old Line 8 

As part of network extension plans in the 1970s, the construction of a north–south line along the Castellana-Recoletos-Prado axis originating in Fuencarral and headed toward Madrid Atocha and further to the south was initiated. The southern stretch toward Carabanchel is now the current Line 11. From this project the construction of the section between Fuencarral and Nuevos Ministerios which opened on 9 June 1982 on the occasion of the celebration of the World Cup in Spain began, as the line gave service to Santiago Bernabeu Stadium.

Given the economic difficulties of the Metro in the 70s and 80s, the rest of the project from the original Line 8 was discarded, and instead only tunnel that connected via line 8 to line 7 is enabled. This way, on Tuesday 23 December 1986, the extension of line 8 from Nuevos Ministerios and Americas Avenue was opened.

The project developed between 1995 and 1998 to merge lines 8 and 10 by building a tunnel between Alonso Martínez and Nuevos Ministerios, left down the stretch Nuevos Ministerios - Avenida de America. Subsequently, on 10 December 1996 the tunnel was opened, after which the line 8 disappeared to lease its infrastructure to line 10. To make this possible, it was necessary to install the platforms projections because, since then, the stretch began to exploit narrow gauge trains.

Stations

Future of Line 8 
Plans exist to extend Line 8 in the future beyond . Projected stops are:

A date for this extension has not yet been given, as it is only in the planning stage. An additional station called Corralejos is planned to be built between Feria de Madrid and Aeropuerto T1-T2-T3, where transfer to the planned line 5 extension will be made.

See also
 Madrid
 Transport in Madrid
 List of Madrid Metro stations
 List of metro systems

References

External links

  Madrid Metro (official website)
 Schematic map of the Metro network – from the official site 
 Madrid at UrbanRail.net
 ENGLISH User guide, ticket types, airport supplement and timings
 Network map (real-distance)
 Madrid Metro Map

08 (Madrid Metro)
Railway lines opened in 1998
Adolfo Suárez Madrid–Barajas Airport
1998 establishments in Spain